Ajit Narain Haksar (11 January 1925 – 19 May 2005) was the first Indian chairman of ITC Limited and was voted the Chairman Emeritus of the company. He has received the 'Outstanding Industrialist Award' and the 'Udyog Rattan Award.'

Early life
Ajit Narain Haksar was born on 11 January 1925, in Gwalior to a Kashmiri Hindu family.  He was educated at the Doon School and subsequently at Allahabad University. He then did an MBA at Harvard Business School.

ITC

Haksar joined ITC in 1948, and was made Marketing Director in 1966. By 1968, Haksar was made Deputy Chairman and was then instated as chairman in 1969. He retired from ITC in 1983 after 34 years with the company, and was succeeded by his brother-in-law, Jagdish Narain Sapru. Haksar was known as the chairman who first took ITC out of purely the tobacco industry and into hotels and paperboards.

Family life

Haksar is survived by his two children and their spouses, four grandchildren and their spouses, and six great-grandchildren.

References

 Autobiography, Bite the Bullet: Thirty-four Years with ITC, New Delhi, India: Viking, Penguin Books India, (1993) 536 p. 
Obituary at Rediff News
Obituary on ITC website

1925 births
2005 deaths
Kashmiri people
The Doon School alumni
Harvard Business School alumni